A National Emergency Message (SAME code: EAN), formerly known until 2022 as an Emergency Action Notification, is the national activation of the Emergency Alert System (EAS) used to alert the residents of the United States of a national or global emergency such as a nuclear war or any other mass casualty situation. This alert can only be activated by the president of the United States or a designated representative thereof, such as the vice president.  The Emergency Broadcast System (EBS) also carried the Emergency Action Notification. No president has ever activated the alert aside from testing, such as the 2011 national EAS test and the 2018 national EAS and WEA tests.

Operation
EAN messages are treated differently to other EAS messages. When a message is received, the receiver is to open an audio channel to the originating source until the End of Message (EOM) tones are received. After the EOM is received, stations will return to normal programming in order to broadcast immediate news coverage of the event. Formerly, stations would not resume broadcast until an Emergency Action Termination (SAME code: EAT) was issued.

The order of broadcast
Before the header codes and attention signal are sent, the participating station reads an introductory script. 
"We interrupt our programming; this is a national emergency. Important instructions will follow."

Emergency messages are then read in this order: 
 Presidential messages (which take priority over any other message)
 Local messages
 State messages
 National Information Center messages

A standby script is used in the case there is no new information available.

The end-of-message codes are transmitted after presidential messages are read. The operator logs the time and date the alert was received, and monitors their EAS source.

Background

The term "Emergency Action Notification" was created when the Emergency Broadcast System went into place in 1963.  Before the mid-1970s, this was the only non-test activation permitted (the same rule also applied to the earlier CONELRAD system). The EAN signifies a national emergency, as the wording shows. The Office of Civil Defense originally created the term for the national emergency notification enactment. FEMA soon took over after its creation.

Past operation
Unlike other messages, the EAN was not the alert itself, but rather a notice that the activation is beginning.   After the End of Message (EOM) tones were sent, normal programming did not resume.  Instead, most stations were to broadcast emergency information in a specific priority order.  Messages from the President are always broadcast first.  Next comes local messages, statewide and regional messages, and finally national messages not originating from the President. When an EAN was initially received, and during any time a new message was not available, an FCC mandated standby script was used (and repeated).   Other stations, which held special permission from the FCC, would sign off until the end of the EAN.

Normal programming would not continue until the transmission of an Emergency Action Termination message (SAME code: EAT).

False alarms
A properly authenticated Emergency Action Notification was incorrectly sent to United States broadcast stations at 9:33 a.m. Eastern Standard Time on February 20, 1971. At the usual time, a weekly EAN test was performed. NORAD teletype operator W.S. Eberhardt had three tapes in front of him: a test tape, and 2 tapes indicating a real emergency, instructing the use of EAN Message #1, and #2, respectively. He inadvertently used the wrong tape, with codeword "HATEFULNESS". This message ordered stations to cease regular programming immediately, and begin an Emergency Action Notification using Message #1. Message 1 states that regular programming has been interrupted at the request of the United States government, but is not specific about the cause. A cancellation message was sent at 9:59 a.m. EST, but the message's codeword, "HATEFULNESS" again, was incorrect. A cancellation message with the correct codeword, "IMPISH", was not sent until 10:13 a.m. EST. After 40 minutes and six incorrect or improperly formatted cancellation messages, the accidental activation was officially terminated.

On June 26, 2007, an EAN was accidentally activated for the state of Illinois, when new satellite delivery equipment for the EAS was accidentally left connected to a live network during what was meant to be a closed-circuit test.

On October 24, 2014, Bobby Bones' syndicated radio program broadcast audio from the 2011 national test of the EAS (the only one that was coded as an EAN), during a segment where he ranted over his local Fox affiliate's scheduling of an EAS test during a World Series game. The broadcast triggered the EAS on some broadcasters and cable systems; the program's distributor iHeartMedia was fined $1 million by the FCC for the incident.

In 2016 or 2017, KUCO-LD in the Sacramento Valley area of California conducted an unauthorized test of the EAS. However, the message read in Spanish said that the activation was for an Emergency Action Notification relaying from station K20FZ. It was due to a wrong video cartridge being inserted instead of an EAS test cartridge.

References

Notes

Emergency Alert System